Prime Broadcasting Network is a broadcast radio network in the Philippines. It operates a number of stations in Luzon, Visayas and Mindanao, mostly under the DABIG C Radio (formerly Prime FM) brand, as well as the flagship syndicated health and wellness program Dok Alternatibo, which is also heard as a blocktimer on several non-Prime radio stations.

PBN stations

Prime FM

Affiliates

References

Mass media companies of the Philippines
Philippine radio networks
Radio stations in the Philippines
Mass media companies established in 1995
Digos
Privately held companies